Boudica's Way is a waymarked long-distance footpath in East Anglia, England, United Kingdom. Along its route, it also passes through the picturesque villages of Saxlingham Nethergate, Shotesham,  and Pulham Market.

History 

The route commemorates the warrior queen of the Iceni, Boudica, who rebelled against the early Roman government and military control in the region of what is now South Norfolk. The path is parallel to the old Roman Pye Road, now the A140 road.

References

External links 
Information from the southern broads region tourism website
Long Distance Walkers Association 
Boudicca Way walking information

Long-distance footpaths in England
Footpaths in Norfolk